Sin is an important concept in Islamic ethics that Muslims view as being anything that goes against the commands of God in Islam Allah (God) or breaching the laws and norms laid down by religion. Islam teaches that sin is an act and not a state of being. It is believed that God weighs an individual's good deeds against their sins on the Day of Judgement and punishes those individuals whose evil deeds outweigh their good deeds.

The Quran describes these sins throughout the texts and demonstrates that some sins are more punishable than others in the hereafter. A clear distinction is made between major sins (al-Kabirah) and minor sins (al-Sagha'ir) (Q53:31–32), indicating that if an individual stays away from the major sins then they will be forgiven of the minor sins. Sources differ on the exact meanings of the different terms for sin used in the Islamic tradition.

Terminology 

A number of different words for sin are used in the Islamic tradition.

According to A.J. Wensinck's entry in the Encyclopedia of Islam, Islamic terms for sin include dhanb and khaṭīʾa, which are synonymous and refer to intentional sins; khiṭʾ, which means simply a sin; and ithm, which is used for grave sins.

According to Cyril Glasse, Islam recognizes two kinds of sin (khati'ah): dhanb, a fault or shortcoming which is to be sanctioned; and ithm, a willful transgression which is to be punished.

In scriptures

Semantic analysis of terminology in the Quran
Several different words are used in the Quran to describe sin—1) Dhanb 2) Ithm 3) Khati’ah 4) Jurm 5) Junah/Haraj. By examining the choice of words in Quranic verses used in connection with these terms, scholars have attempted to determine which sins are associated with which terms.

Dhanb 

Dhanb (plural dhunub) is frequently applied to heinous sins committed against Allah. One of the main examples of Dhanb in the Quran is of "crying lies of Allah's signs", or having excessive pride that prevents an individual from believing the signs of God.

This use of dhanb in the Quran exemplifies that this type of sin is punishable in the afterlife. In fact, dhanb is considered a 'great' sin and is often used in the Quran to contrast with sayyi’a, which denotes a 'smaller' sin. The Quran states that if you avoid these great sins, your lesser evil deeds or sayyi'at will be forgiven.

Ithm 

Some scholars believe the basic meaning of ithm to be an unlawful deed that is committed intentionally. This contrasts to dhanb in that dhanb can be both intentional and unintentional. However, this definition is somewhat nebulous and the best description of the word is based on the contextual situations. In the Quran, ithm is found quite frequently in legislative descriptions. For example, falsely accusing your own wife in order to gain money is constituted as an ithm (Quran 4:24-20). However, ithm is also used in connection with haram, or committing an unlawful deed, a taboo, such as consuming food or drink that is forbidden by God:

Ithm is also associated with what is considered the worst sin of all, shirk. Shirk signifies the accepting of a presence of other divinities at the side of God. The Quran states that:

This association with shirk is noteworthy for shirk is considered unforgivable if not repented of.

Khati’ah 

Khati’ah is considered by many scholars to be a "moral lapse" or a "mistake". This interpretation has led some scholars to believe that Khati’ah is a lesser sin than ithm; however, the word Khati’ah is frequently used in conjunction with ithm in the Quran.

"Say: "O my Servants who have transgressed against their souls! Despair not of the Mercy of Allah: for Allah forgives all sins: for He is Oft-Forgiving, Most Merciful." Surah Az Zumar, 39:53

Again, God says to the believers in a Hadith Qudsi:
"O son of Adam, so long as you call upon Me, and ask of Me, I shall forgive you for what you have done, and I shall not mind. O son of Adam, were your sins to reach the clouds of the sky and were you then to ask forgiveness of Me, I would forgive you. O son of Adam were you to come to Me with sins nearly as great as the earth, and were you then to face Me, ascribing no partner to Me, I would bring you forgiveness nearly as great as it."

This Quranic verse indicates that khati’ah is considered an ithm, a grave sin. In fact, the word khati’ah is associated with some of the most heinous religious sins in the Quran. In one Quranic verse this word is used to describe the sin of slaying one's own children for fear of poverty. (Quran 17:33-31). Scholars believe that dhanb or ithm could be used in place of khati’ah in this instance; however, the word choice indicates that khati’ah is more than just a moral lapse or mistake and is punishable. And all sins are eligible for forgiveness through God's mercy and repentance.

Jurm 

The word Jurum is often considered to be a synonym of dhanb for it is used to describe some of the same sins: crying lies of God and not believing the signs of God. In the Quran, the word mostly appears in the form of mujrim, one who commits a jurm. These individuals are described in the Quran as having arrogance towards the believers.

Junah/Haraj 

Junah and Haraj have a similar meaning to that of ithm, a sin that warrants a punishment. In fact, these words are used almost interchangeably with ithm in the same chapters in the Quran. Like ithm, these words are found frequently in legislative portions of the Quran, particularly relating to regulations regarding 
marriage and divorce.

Definition in Hadith
Sin is discussed extensively in the hadith, (the collection of Muhammad's sayings). It is reported by An-Nawwas bin Sam'an: 

Wabisah bin Ma’bad reported: 

In Sunan al-Tirmidhi, a Hadith is narrated:

In Sahih Muslim, Abu Ayyub al-Ansari and Abu Huraira narrated:

Repentance of sin

The Islamic concept of repentance for any sins and misdeeds is called tawba. It is a direct matter between a person and God, so there is no intercession or formal, ecclesiastical confession to a religious leader. There is also no concept of original sin in Islam. It is the act of leaving what God has prohibited and returning to what he has commanded. The word denotes the act of being repentant for one's misdeeds, atoning for those misdeeds, and having a strong determination to forsake those misdeeds (remorse, resolution, and repentance). If someone sins against another person, restitution is required.

Major sins: Al-Kaba'ir

The most heinous sins in Islam are known as al-Kaba'ir which translates to the great or major one. Some authors use the term enormity. While every sin is seen as an offense to Allah, the al-Kaba'ir are the gravest of the offenses. Allah's power is thought to be only eclipsed by his mercy and thus minor or small sins (al-sagha'ir), are tacitly understood to be forgiven after repentance. Not every sin is equal however and some are thought to be more spiritually hurting than others. The greatest of the sins described as al-Kaba'ir is the association of others with Allah or Shirk.

Hadiths differ as to how many major sins there are.  Different hadith list three, four, or seven major sins.
In contrasting major sins with minor sins, the eighth-century Shafi'i scholar Al-Dhahabi found the hadith collections of Sahih al-Bukhari and Muslim ibn al-Hajjaj listed seven major sins.  Ibn Ḥajar al-Haythamī (d. 974/1567) found 467 major sins, and "often-quoted definition attributed" to "companion of the prophet" and mufassir Abd Allah ibn Abbas (d. 68/686–8), states that a major sin is "everything for which God has prescribed a fixed punishment (ḥadd) in this world and the Fire in the hereafter",  bringing the number closer to seventy major sins.

Some of the major or al-Kaba'ir sins in Islam are as follows:

 Shirk (reverence due Allah directed toward those other than Allah);
 Committing murder (taking away someone's life);
 Theft;
 Consuming the property of an orphan placed in one's care;
Leaving off the five daily prayers (Salah);
Not paying the minimum amount of Zakat when the person is required to do so;
Not fasting on the days of Ramadan (without a valid reason such as medical, traveling, too young, too old, etc.);
Never having performed Hajj to the holy city of Mecca (within one's lifetime) while being financially able to do so (as per the Qur'an 3:97);
Cutting off the ties of relationships; (choosing to never speak to one's parents for example and not forgive them, as all are human and make mistakes.)
Homosexuality;
Committing zina (adultery and/or fornication); 
Using intoxicants (khamr), such as alcohol, or any other mind-altering drugs or harmful substances. (To harm one's body is considered sinful);
Taking or paying interest (riba); 
Lying on religion, i.e.: lying on Allah (God), Muhammad, Jesus or any of God's prophets or creations except to prevent harm to others or dissent in the community.

Good deeds in Islam include:
Enjoining right;
Forbidding evil;
Kindness to all others;
Planting trees and preserving the environment;
Not hunting animals except for food;
Never harming an animal;
Kindness to parents; with specific emphasis placed on kindness to one's mother;
Forgiving wrongs and apologizing and seeking forgiveness from those a Muslim has wronged;
To right one's wrongs;
Pick up harmful things from the road to prevent them from harming others;
To respect members of all religions;
To raise an orphan and feed the needy;

These references do not constitute all major sins in Islam or the extensive list of good deeds. There are other fifty-four other notable major sins and countless good deeds. Even the smallest act of kindness such as a friendly word or a smile is considered a good deed and rewardable kind act. Some within this list also represent the opinions of particular scholars and so they do not perfectly represent Islam. Islam encourages all of mankind to work to do good deeds every day and to avoid bad deeds/sins, to be the best they can be.

Although many of the ideas for what is unacceptable overlap, the seven major sins of Islam differs from the seven deadly sins of Christianity. The Islamic sins refer more to specific undesirable behavior rather than to the general negative characteristics or actions of the cardinal Christian sins. Despite the similar names, the seven main sins in Islam are more comparable to the Ten Commandments rather than the seven deadly sins. They both provide the bottom line for believers in terms of what is acceptable behavior in the faith. The actions themselves differ most of the major crimes in Islam relate to subservience to Allah. Any form of polytheism is seen to be the most severe offense in the religion and all of the other transgressions are in some form of association with Allah. Witchcraft, for example, is the taking on of supernatural powers in order to make the practitioner a being above the normal human. This challenges the power of Allah as the person in question has superseded their mortal position to become something greater and akin to a god. The same can be said of murder, as ultimately the power to decide who shall live and die is believed to belong solely to Allah. Life is thought to be a gift from Allah and the unjust taking of life is a severe spiritual offense, as it is not only seen as morally wrong but also as an affront to God.

In addition to what Muslim scholars agree are the principal seven sins, the idea exists that the major sins extend far past the seven. These additional transgressions, potentially up to seventy, are not universally settled upon nor are they explicitly stated in the Qur'an, however they are thought to be implied by the text. The supplementary sins as a whole lack the spiritual gravity of the original seven and include things such as drinking alcohol and eavesdropping.

See also
 Outline of Islam
 Glossary of Islam
 Index of Islam-related articles
 Islamic views on piety

References

Islamic belief and doctrine
Sin